Renato de Albuquerque is a Brazilian civil engineer and entrepreneur in the construction and real estate businesses. He was cofounder of a pioneering construction firm, Albuquerque & Takaoka, in 1951 alongside fellow architect and friend Yojiro Takaoka. Both studied at the University of São Paulo Polytechnic School, graduating in 1949.

Together with Takaoka, Albuquerque is responsible for the creation of the first vertical and the first horizontal walled condominiums in Brazil. The Alphaville concept was widely copied throughout Brazil and is a very successful enterprise, currently with more than 20 locations in Brazil and Portugal. In October 2006, Alphaville was purchased by Gafisa S.A.

He is also the editor-in-chief of the Alpha Magazine and president of the Alphaville Foundation, a charity and not-for-profit NGO. He is an honorary citizen of Campinas and Barueri.

References

Brazilian civil engineers
Brazilian businesspeople
Year of birth missing (living people)
Living people